Municipal election for Lalitpur took place on 13 May 2022, with all 147 positions up for election across 29 wards. The electorate elected a mayor, a deputy mayor, 29 ward chairs and 116 ward members. An indirect election will also be held to elect five female members and an additional three female members from the Dalit and minority community to the municipal executive.

Chiri Babu Maharjan of Nepali Congress was re-elected, winning 56.5% of the votes.

Background 
Lalitpur was established as a municipality in 1953. The metropolitan city was created in 2017 by incorporating wards 1 to 13 of Karyabinayak municipality into Lalitpur sub-metropolitan city. Electors in each ward elect a ward chair and four ward members, out of which two must be female and one of the two must belong to the Dalit community.

In the previous election, Chiri Babu Maharjan from Nepali Congress was elected as the first mayor of the metropolitan city.

Candidates

Exit polls

Results

Ward Results 

|-
! colspan="2" style="text-align:left;" | Party
! Chairman
! Members
|-
| style="background-color:;" |
| style="text-align:left;" |Nepali Congress
| style="text-align:center;" |11
| style="text-align:center;" |44
|-
| style="background-color:;" |
| style="text-align:left;" |CPN (Unified Marxist-Leninist)
| style="text-align:center;" |11
| style="text-align:center;" |44
|-
| style="background-color:;" |
| style="text-align:left;" |CPN (Maoist Centre)
| style="text-align:center;" |3
| style="text-align:center;" |9
|-
| style="background-color:;" |
| style="text-align:left;" |CPN (Unified Socialist)
| style="text-align:center;" |2
| style="text-align:center;" |7
|-
| style="background-color:;" |
| style="text-align:left;" |Rastriya Prajatantra Party
| style="text-align:center;" |0
| style="text-align:center;" |2
|-
| style="background-color:;" |
| style="text-align:left;" | Independent
| style="text-align:center;" |2
| style="text-align:center;" |0
|-
| style="background-color:white;" |
| style="text-align:left;" | Vacant
| style="text-align:center;" |0
| style="text-align:center;" |10
|-
! colspan="2" style="text-align:right;" | Total
! 29
! 116
|}

Summary of ward results 

Note: 1 candidate from CPN (UML) for Ward Member was elected unopposed under Dalit woman reserved seats. 10 ward member seats reserved for Dalit women were left unfilled due to lack of candidates.

Results for municipal executive election 
The municipal executive consists of the mayor, who is also the chair of the municipal executive, the deputy mayor and ward chairs from each ward. The members of the municipal assembly will elect five female members and three members from the Dalit and minority community to the municipal executive.

Municipal Assembly composition

Results

Municipal Executive composition

See also 

 2022 Nepalese local elections
 2022 Kathmandu municipal elections

References 

Lalitpur District, Nepal
Lalitpur